The Houston Alianza, also known as Allianza Internacional, was an American soccer club based in Houston, Texas that was a member of the Lone Star Soccer Alliance from 1988 to 1991.

History
Alianza began as an Hispanic All-Star team from the Houston Soccer Association. The team entered the LSSA for the 1988 season and continued to exist until folding before the 1992 season. During its early existence, Victor Delgadillo managed the team which was composed of several ex-professionals from Mexico and Central America who now played strictly as amateurs.

Year-by-year

References

External links
 Yearly league standings

Defunct soccer clubs in Texas
Alianza
Lone Star Soccer Alliance teams
1988 establishments in Texas
1992 disestablishments in Texas
Association football clubs established in 1988
Association football clubs disestablished in 1992